Staufferia is a monotypic genus of flowering plants belonging to the family Santalaceae. It just contains one species, Staufferia capuronii Z.S.Rogers, Nickrent & Malécot 

It is native to Madagascar.

The genus name of Staufferia is in honour of Hans Ulrich Stauffer (1929–1965), a Swiss botanist who traveled in South Africa, Australia and New Guinea; specialist in Santalaceae. The Latin specific epithet of capuronii is in honor of the French botanist René Capuron. Both the genus and the species were first described and published in Ann. Missouri Bot. Gard. Vol.95 on pages 394-395 in 2008.

References

Santalaceae
Santalales genera
Plants described in 2008
Endemic flora of Madagascar